Gujarat Vidyapith is a deemed university in Ahmedabad, Gujarat, India. It was founded in 1920 by Mahatma Gandhi, the leader of the Indian independence movement, and deemed a university in 1963.

Etymology
"Vidyapith," in many languages of India, means university.

History

The university was founded on 18 October 1920 as a 'Rashtriya Vidyapith' ('National University') by Mahatma Gandhi, who would serve throughout his life as the kulpati (chancellor) and all needs of Fund collected by sardar Vallabhbhai Patel by his personal relations and capacity.

The Gujarat Vidyapith was started in Dahyabhai Mehta's bungalow behind the Kocharab Ashram (the Kocharab Aashram was started in barrister Jivanlal Desai's bungalow).

Its purpose was to promote educational institutions run by Indians for Indians outside the financial and governing control of British authorities. The university helped nationalists establish a system of education for all Indians, thus proving the country's independence from British-run institutions and de-legitimizing the British Raj. Its foundation was one of the important event of an initiative  satyagraha launched by Gandhi as a means to peacefully terminate British rule in India.

The vidyapith's foundation was emulated by nationalists in Benares, Bombay, Calcutta, Nagpur, Madras and in many cities across India. Answering Gandhi's call to boycott British institutions, influences and goods, many thousands of students and teachers left British colleges to join the Vidyapith.

People like Jivatram Kripalani and Nanabhai Bhatt volunteered to teach.

The Gujarat Vidyapith became a 'deemed university' in 1963. It is funded and governed by the University Grants Commission, under the Union Ministry for Human Resources Development in New Delhi. Although considerably modernized in its structure and curriculum, the university maintains its commitment to Gandhian ideals, human studies, social service and development work.

Goals
The institution officially embraced Gandhi's goals as its mission:

Adherence to truth and non-violence
Participation in productive work with a sense of dignity of labour
Acceptance of equality of religions
Priority for the needs of village dwellers in all curricula and
Use of mother-tongue as a medium of instructions

Organisation and administration

Colleges
The colleges and institutions  with the university are
Shikshan Vidyashakha (College of Education), Ahmedabad
Hindi Teacher Training College, Ahmedabad
Mahadevbhai Desai Gramseva Mahavidyalaya, Radheja
Mahadevbhai Desai Gramseva Mahavidyalaya (College), Sadara
Mahadevbhai Desai Sharirik Shikshan Mahavidyalaya (College of Physical Education), Sadara
Center for Rural Management, Randheja

The university offers a wide range of degrees, including Ph.D. programs and doctoral studies. It continues to emphasize social service, Gandhian studies and subjects associated with religion, human studies, culture and public service.

Departments and centres

Department of History and Culture (offers full-time courses: M.A., M.Phil. and Ph.D.)
Tribal Research & Training Institute (TRTI)
Hindi Prachar Samiti (Hindi Bhavan)
Bharatiya Bhasha Sanskruti Kendra
Jamnalal Bajaj Institute of Studies in Ahimsa (Peace Research Institute)
Department of Adult and Continuing Education & Extension Work including Population Education
State Resource Centre (SRC) for Adult & Continuing Education including Population Education
Gujarat Vidyapith Library (Gandhi Bhavan)
Publication Department
Rural Service Extension Centre
Krishi Vigyan Kendras
 Krishi Vigyan Kendra - Randheja (Gandhinagar) (Agriculture Science Centre)
P.G. Center for Studies in Rural Management at village Randheja
International Centre for Jain Studies at Ahmedabad campus
Centre for Bio-gas Research Education & Extension at Sadra
Instrumentation Centre at village Sadra (Level-I) and Mobile Vocational Training Centre
Late Jankidevi Bajaj Centre for Naturopathy, Randheja
Bio Gas Research Center, Sadra [offers Ph.D., M.Phil., M.Sc. (2 years), B.Sc. (3 years) in Microbiology]
B.voc 
food processing technology (3 year)
Panchayati Raj Talim Kendra
Computer Science Department [offers two full-time courses: MCA (3 years) and PGDCA (1 year)]

List of Chancellors of Gujarat Vidyapith
The following have held the post of the Chancellor of Gujarat Vidyapith.

References

Gujarat in Indian independence movement
Universities and colleges in Ahmedabad
1920 establishments in India
Educational institutions established in 1920